NB is a Scottish television programme about the arts and what's on guide in the entertainment world within the Central belt of  Scotland.

History
NB debuted in 1989 and aired until it ended in 1997. Produced by Scottish Television, it was largely conceived by its producer Donny O'Rourke, and presented by a young, all-Scottish cast.  Daily Record television critic Paul English wrote that the show "helped shape the taste of Scotland's clubbers, gig-goers, opera lovers and theatre-buffs too".

Series
23 series were produced, with most years having 3 series each.

 Series 1: 27 April - 1 June 1989: 6 episodes 
 Series 2: 2 October - November 1989

Presenters
 JaniceForsyth (1989–1995)
 Bryan Burnett (1989–1993)
 Allan Campbell (1989–1997)
 Dougie Vipond (1993–1997)
 Sally Gray (1995–1997)
 Angus Coull (1996–1997)

References

External links

Arts in Scotland
Scottish television shows
1980s Scottish television series
1990s Scottish television series
Television shows produced by Scottish Television
Television shows set in Scotland
English-language television shows
1989 Scottish television series debuts
1997 Scottish television series endings